Compass point may refer to:
 Cardinal direction, north, south, east or west
 Points of the compass or compass point, a direction on a traditional compass
 Compass Point (album)
 Compass Point Shopping Centre, now known as Compass One, a shopping mall in Singapore
 Compass Point Studios, a studio in Nassau, Bahamas